Winigan is an unincorporated village and census-designated place in southeastern Sullivan County, Missouri, United States. The Sullivan - Linn county line is one-half mile south of the community.

Demographics

History
The land upon which Winigan sits was obtained from the U.S. government in February 1857 by Noah Harl and exchanged hands five times before coming into the possession of James M. Thrasher.
The town of Winigan was laid out in early February 1880, encompassing an area of six blocks on land belonging to Thrasher. A post office had been established in 1874 with Mr. Van Klelsie as the first postmaster. According to local folklore, the town was named in honor of a Mr. Winnegan, an early settler to southern Sullivan County who had been killed by a panther in the 1840s. The first store was opened in 1878 and by 1888 Winigan had a population of twenty-five families. It was then, and remained for many years, dependent on supplying the needs of farms located in southeastern Sullivan County. To that end, Winigan at one time had two dry goods stores, two blacksmith shops, a drug store and combination steam saw/grist mill.

A large turkey farm and hatchery was owned and run by the Borron family near Winigan in the mid and late 1900s. For many years Winigan had one of the longest running community street fairs in north Missouri. It was held on the first weekend in August for over six decades. The highlight was the Winnigan Centennial in 1973, which drew a crowd of over 5,000. The Winigan Strawberry Festival is held each June and the Winigan 4-H Fair has been held each year since 1938.

Winigan has twice been the scene of a bank robbery. The first happened on December 19, 1945, as three armed men stole more than $6,000 at gunpoint from the Citizen's Bank of Winigan. Quick thinking by town merchant Ivan Cable helped foil the robbery however. Cable let the air out of one of the tires on the getaway vehicle. The robbers first attempted to drive away but soon abandoned the car and escaped on foot. Later the same night they were apprehended at a nearby farm house. Two were arrested, while the third killed himself by gunshot. The second bank robbery took place on July 2, 2009, as two men held up the Winigan branch of the Bank of Brookfield-Purdin, escaping with an undisclosed amount of cash. The pair were later caught and tried for a series of similar bank thefts.

Notable person
 Bud Houser, winner of three Olympic gold medals.

References

Unincorporated communities in Sullivan County, Missouri
Unincorporated communities in Missouri
Census-designated places in Missouri